Clarence Ransom Edwards (1859–1931) was a U.S. Army major general. General Edwards may also refer to:

Clement Alexander Edwards (1812–1882), British Army general
Donald E. Edwards (1937–2018), U.S. Army major general
Idwal H. Edwards (1895–1981), U.S. Air Force lieutenant general
James Bevan Edwards (1834–1922), British Army lieutenant general
John Edwards (Arkansas politician) (1815–1894), Union Army brigadier general
John Edwards (British Army officer) (born 1896), British Army major general
Oliver Edwards (1835–1904), Union Army brevet major general
Oliver Edwards (World War I general) (1871–1921), U.S. Army brigadier general
William F.S. Edwards (1872–1941), British Army brigadier general